Idiomarina abyssalis is a Gram-negative, halophilic and aerobic bacterium from the genus of Idiomarina which has been isolated from seawater from a depth of 4000  5000 metre from the Pacific Ocean.

References

Bacteria described in 2000
Alteromonadales